Țara Călatei is a region in Transylvania, Romania. It is one of the many areas in Western Romania with a significant Hungarian population, and it is a stronghold of old Transylvanian Hungarian folk traditions.

Geography 
Țara Călatei is a rural region situated just west of Cluj-Napoca in the western part of Cluj County and in the southern part of Sălaj County. Its historical center is the small town of Huedin. The region has an ethnically mixed population: Romanians, Hungarians and Roma. Its Jewish population suffered heavily during the Second World War. In 2011 the census results of Romania show that the Hungarians are 20,000 people strong and form a minority of 30 percent of the total population.

Name 
The region takes its name from the Călata people. The name formerly referred to a much larger territory; according to Lajos Kelemen's study on the history and historical monuments of the Țara Călatei region, during the Middle Ages the area reached from the Barcău River to the Crişul Repede River. The region as it is known today lies mainly west of Cluj-Napoca, although there are also some villages to the north and east as well which follow Kalotaszeg customs.

Țara Călatei in popular culture 
The region was featured in the film Kalotaszegi Madonna ("Madonna from Țara Călatei", 1943), made in Northern Transylvania, when it was a part Kingdom of Hungary (1920–1946) between 1940-1944. The plot revolves around the region and the city of Cluj-Napoca, but some of the scenes were shot in the region as well.

The Hungarian Community 
Hungarians, mostly minority in the region, are nevertheless in high number, and majority in some villages. The dominant religion in this ethnic group is Calvinism, with the exception of the village Leghia which is Catholic, and Huedin also has a smaller Catholic church. The churches are typically of white color, surrounded by wall, they have a tetragonal bell tower with a wooden pointed dome. The worship is attended segregated by gender and age.

Female traditional clothes can be distinguished by being very highly colorful and decorated, with corollas full of pearls. Such items can be found in the Ethnographic Museums in Budapest and in Cluj-Napoca, but the locals still preserve, produce and wear these clothes on special occasions.
Since they live near Cluj-Napoca, they largely take part in the Hungarian Cultural Days of Cluj as organizers or folklore performers.

Gallery

References

External links
Kalotaszeg

|

Historical regions of Transylvania